The Smith Fork Creek is a large stream that flows through Middle Tennessee in the United States, draining much of the southwestern Upper Cumberland region. It is a major tributary of the Caney Fork River, and is part of the Cumberland, Ohio and Mississippi basins.

Geography
The stream flows directly through the town of Statesville, following Highway 267 toward DeKalb County. Before crossing into DeKalb County, Smith Fork picks up Saunders Fork, a major tributary, which drains much of northwestern Cannon County, including Auburntown. The creek then slowly meanders northeast through western DeKalb County, picking up the Clear Fork Creek in Liberty and Dry Creek in Dowelltown. After passing through Temperance Hall, the creek enters Smith County and passes on the west side of Lancaster. The Smith Fork then empties into the Caney Fork River under a railroad bridge along the Nashville and Eastern Railroad, a place known as Seabowisha.

See also
Center Hill Lake
List of rivers of Tennessee

References

External links
Caney Fork River Water Quality Management Plan 
Caney Fork Watershed Association

Rivers of DeKalb County, Tennessee
Rivers of Smith County, Tennessee
Rivers of Wilson County, Tennessee
Tributaries of the Cumberland River
Rivers of Tennessee